The 2019–20 Premier League Tournament Tier B is the second division of the 32nd season of first-class cricket in Sri Lanka's Premier Trophy. The tournament started on 31 January and was originally scheduled to conclude on 11 April 2020.

Lankan Cricket Club won the tournament in the previous season and were promoted to Tier A. They were replaced in Tier B by Sri Lanka Ports Authority Cricket Club after their relegation from Tier A. The league was expanded to twelve teams, with the addition of Kandy Customs Cricket Club, Nugegoda Sports and Welfare Club and Sebastianites Cricket and Athletic Club.

On 16 March 2020, Sri Lanka Cricket postponed the rest of the tournament due to the COVID-19 pandemic. In July 2020, Sri Lanka Cricket announced that Tier A would resume on 14 July 2020. The Tier B tournament never resumed and was cancelled in August 2020 after seven rounds of matches (of eleven planned rounds).

Points table

Matches

Round 1

Round 2

Round 3

Round 4

Round 5

Round 6

Round 7

See also
 2019–20 Premier League Tournament Tier A

References

External links
 Series home at ESPN Cricinfo

Premier League Tournament Tier B
Premier League Tournament Tier B
Premier League Tournament Tier B, 2019-20